Frisco Waterfront is a 1935 American drama film directed by Arthur Lubin and Joseph Santley and starring Ben Lyon, Helen Twelvetrees and Rod La Rocque.

Plot
Gubernatorial candidate Glen Burton hates newspaper editor Dan Elliott, who married Glen's former wife, Alice. On election day in San Francisco, Glen and Dan are both voting in a tent when a truck runs into it. As Glen is taken to the operating room, political boss Corrigan tells him that he is wrong to hate Dan. In the operating room, Glen relives his life.

In 1917 Glen and Alice were engaged, but Glenn is shipped out to serve in World War One and is reported as missing in action. Dan proposes marriage to Alice and she accepts but then Glenn appears, accusing Dan of being a war coward and trying to steal Alice.

Glen and Alice get married and Glen studies to be a lawyer but is unable to find a job. Dan offers him one but Glen refuses.

Glen gets a job on the waterfront and becomes foreman, but Alice is upset at his lack of ambition. This causes them to argue and she leaves him.

Alice suggests to Dan that they use Glen's hatred of them to inspire his ambition. Corrigan gets Glen a job in the district attorney's office and Glen works his way up to district attorney. Glenn eventually runs for governor.

Glen goes through the operation successfully and wakes up to discover he has won the election and that Dan has died.  Glen reunites with Alice.

Cast
Ben Lyon as Glenn Burton
 Helen Twelvetrees as Alice
 Rod La Rocque as Dan Elliott
 Russell Hopton as Eddie
 James Burke as Corrigan
 Henry Kolker as District Attorney
 Purnell Pratt as Dr. Stevens
 Barbara Pepper as The Blonde Stranger
 Lee Shumway as Foreman
 Norman Houston as Johnson

Production
In April 1935 Republic announced they intended to make a film based on the novel Frisco Waterfront by Norman Houston, based on the 1934 West Coast waterfront strike.

Filming started October 1935. It was the second film Lubin made for Republic.

References

External links
Frisco Waterfront at IMDB
Frisco Waterfront at Letterbox DVD
Frisco Waterfront at BFI
Frisco Waterfront at TCMD

1935 films
Films directed by Arthur Lubin
Films directed by Joseph Santley
1935 drama films
American drama films
American black-and-white films
1930s English-language films
Republic Pictures films
Films set in San Francisco
1930s American films